Tyler Hall (born October 31, 1998) is an American football cornerback for the Las Vegas Raiders of the National Football League (NFL). He was signed by the Atlanta Falcons as an undrafted free agent in 2020 following his college football career with the Wyoming Cowboys.

Professional career

Atlanta Falcons
Hall signed with the Atlanta Falcons as an undrafted free agent following the 2020 NFL Draft on April 27, 2020. He was waived during final roster cuts on September 5, and signed to the team's practice squad the next day. He was released from the practice squad on September 22, and re-signed to the practice squad three days later. He was elevated to the active roster on September 26 and October 10 for the team's weeks 3 and 5 games against the Chicago Bears and Carolina Panthers, and reverted to the practice squad after each game. He made his NFL debut against the Bears, playing 17 snaps on special teams. He was promoted to the active roster on October 13.

Hall signed a contract extension with the Falcons on March 11, 2021. He was released on August 9, 2021.

Los Angeles Rams
On August 10, 2021, Hall was claimed off waivers by the Los Angeles Rams. He was waived on August 31, 2021 and re-signed to the practice squad the next day. Hall won Super Bowl LVI when the Rams beat the Cincinnati Bengals. 

On February 15, 2022, Hall signed a reserve/future contract with the Rams. He was waived/injured on August 30, 2022 and placed on injured reserve. He was waived off injured reserve on September 6, 2022.

Las Vegas Raiders
On October 11, 2022, Hall was signed to the Las Vegas Raiders practice squad. Hall recorded his first sack on November 20, during a pivotal moment against the Denver Broncos, sacking Russell Wilson. Hall was elevated for the following game against the Seattle Seahawks, his first start in the NFL. On November 28, 2022, Hall was signed to the active roster.

References

External links
Atlanta Falcons bio
Wyoming Cowboys football bio

1998 births
Living people
Sportspeople from Hawthorne, California
Players of American football from California
American football cornerbacks
Wyoming Cowboys football players
Atlanta Falcons players
Los Angeles Rams players
Las Vegas Raiders players